The 1920 Armagh County Council election was held on Saturday, 5 June 1920.

Council results
The results were as follows:

Division results

Armagh Electoral Division

Forkhill Electoral Division

Keady Electoral Division

Lurgan Electoral Division

Markethill Electoral Division

Portsdown Electoral Division
There was no contest in Portsdown Electoral Division, as only 4 candidates were nominated for the 4 seats.

References

1920 Irish local elections